The 2018–19 Azerbaijan First Division  is the second-level of football in Azerbaijan. Sabail-2 were the defending champions.

Teams
Sabah was promoted from the 2017–18 season to Azerbaijan Premier League, while Kapaz relegated to the First Division. 

On 9 August 2018, it was announced that Keşla-2, Neftçi-2, Qarabağ-2, Sabah-2, Sabail-2,  Sumgayit-2 and Zira-2 will participate in the First Division.

Bine, Khazar and Mil-Muğan didn't participate in this season.

Table

Season statistics

Top scorers

References

External links
 pfl.az
 AFFA 

Azerbaijan First Division seasons
Azerbaijan First Division
2